B92 is a broadcaster with national coverage headquartered in Belgrade, Serbia

B92 may also refer to:
 B92, a postcode district in the B postcode area, United Kingdom
 Bundesstraße 92, a German road
 , an Austrian road
 Sicilian Defence, Najdorf Variation, according to the list of chess openings
 B92, a type of Docklands Light Railway train, London